Laser science or laser physics is a branch of optics that describes the theory and practice of lasers.

Laser science is principally concerned with quantum electronics, laser construction, optical cavity design, the physics of producing a population inversion in laser media, and the temporal evolution of the light field in the laser. It is also concerned with the physics of laser beam propagation, particularly the physics of Gaussian beams, with laser applications, and with associated fields such as nonlinear optics and quantum optics.

History

Laser science predates the invention of the laser itself. Albert Einstein created the foundations for the laser and maser in 1917, via a paper in which he re-derived Max Planck’s law of radiation using a formalism based on probability coefficients (Einstein coefficients) for the absorption, spontaneous emission, and stimulated emission of electromagnetic radiation. The existence of stimulated emission was confirmed in 1928 by Rudolf W. Ladenburg. In 1939, Valentin A. Fabrikant made the earliest laser proposal. He specified the conditions required for light amplification using stimulated emission. In 1947, Willis E. Lamb and R. C. Retherford found apparent stimulated emission in hydrogen spectra and effected the first demonstration of stimulated emission; in 1950, Alfred Kastler (Nobel Prize for Physics 1966) proposed the method of optical pumping, experimentally confirmed, two years later, by Brossel, Kastler, and Winter.

The theoretical principles describing the operation of a microwave laser (a maser) were first described by Nikolay Basov and Alexander Prokhorov at the All-Union Conference on Radio Spectroscopy in May 1952. The first maser was built by Charles H. Townes, James P. Gordon, and Herbert J. Zeiger in 1953. Townes, Basov and Prokhorov were awarded the Nobel Prize in Physics in 1964 for their research in the field of stimulated emission. Arthur Ashkin, Gérard Mourou, and Donna Strickland were awarded the Nobel Prize in Physics in 2018 for groundbreaking inventions in the field of laser physics.

The first working laser (a pulsed ruby laser) was demonstrated on May 16, 1960, by Theodore Maiman at the Hughes Research Laboratories.

See also
Laser acronyms
List of laser types

References

External links
 A very detailed tutorial on lasers